Paraliparis membranaceus is a species of snailfish only known from a single specimen of 57 mm standard length collected in Sarmiento Channel in the fjordlands of southern Chile.

This species is similar to Paraliparis molinai but differs in details of dentition and pectoral fin shape.

References

Further reading
 
 

Liparidae
Fish described in 1887
Taxa named by Albert Günther